Dr. Jeyasekharan Hospital was founded in Nagercoil in the southernmost district of India. It was established by the late Dr. N. D. Jeyasekharan in 1965. It is  ISO 9001-2015 and ISO 14001:2015 Bureau Veritas certified & NABH Accredited. Presently, the Dr. Jeyasekharan Medical Trust includes Dr. Jeyasekharan Hospital and Nursing Home, the JMT Pharmacy, the School of Nursing & Paramedical Education,Dr. Jeyasekharan College of Nursing , Postgraduate medical education accredited to National Board of Examinations, JMT college of Allied Health Sciences and the Jeyasekharan Educational and Research Charitable Trust.

History
In June 1965, Dr. N.D. Jeyasekharan left the Neyyoor Medical Mission after serving it for nearly nine years. He and his wife Rani started a nursing home with bare necessities. Shortly thereafter, the doctor decided to build a set of rooms with basic amenities, a good theatre and a labour room. Those were times when there were no tar roads, no street lights and no traffic except a few lorries as it was an isolated corner of the town. Fifty patient rooms, an operating theatre, a labour room and a general ward were built.

The Jeyasekharan Nursing Home was opened in a public meeting on 15 November 1967 by Dr. A. Asirvatham. Dr. Asirvatham, Principal and Dean of Madurai Medical College, was a former teacher of Dr. Jeyasekharan at Madras Medical College.

Today, the hospital is recognized by the National Board of Examinations, New Delhi. Medical students from the U.K. and Germany have been coming here for their elective postings.

Dr. N.D. Jeyasekharan took premature retirement, giving way for his sons to carry on the work he started. He died on 30 January 2006.

Departments and units
 Dr. Jeyasekharan Hospital is a multispeciality hospital with the following departments: 
Anaesthesia
Bronchoscopy
Cardiology
Dermatology
Dentistry
ENT
Gastroenterology
General Medicine
General surgery
Maxillofacial surgery
Nephrology/Haemodialysis
Neurology
Neuro-surgery
Obstetrics & Gynaecology
Oncology
Ophthalmic surgery
Orthopaedics
Paediatrics
Paediatric surgery
Palliative medicine
Plastic surgery
Psychiatry
Pulmonology
Radiology/ sonology
Rheumatology
Urology

The hospital also houses several intensive care and intermediate care units, including a multidisciplinary intensive/intermediary care unit, an intensive/intermediate coronary care unit, a paediatric intensive care unit and stepdown ward, a postoperative ward and a neonatal intensive care unit.

Clinical services

Clinical services include:
Biochemistry lab
Clinical Pathology lab
Microbiology lab
Blood bank
Dietetics
Occupational therapy
Physiotherapy
Pharmacy
Ambulance

References

Dr. Jeyasekharan Hospital & Nursing home
Dr. Jeyasekharan Hospital and medical trust

External links
 http://www.jeyasekharanmedicaltrust.com/
 https://www.facebook.com/pages/Dr-Jeyasekharan-Medical-Trust/

Hospitals in Tamil Nadu
Nursing homes in India
Nagercoil
1965 establishments in Madras State
Hospitals established in 1965